Theodoros Aloupis (14 December 1929 – 5 November 2018) was a Greek footballer. He played in one match for the Greece national football team in 1953. He was also part of Greece's team for their qualification matches for the 1954 FIFA World Cup.

References

External links
 

1929 births
2018 deaths
Greek footballers
Greece international footballers
Place of birth missing
Association football defenders
Panathinaikos F.C. players